UFG can refer to:
Francisco Gavidia University (Universidad Francisco Gavidia)
Universidade Federal de Goiás, Brazil
Ulchi-Freedom Guardian
United Front Games